State Highway 10 (West Bengal) is a state highway in West Bengal, India.

Route
SH 10 originates from Malda Town and passes through Manikchak, Ratua, Samsi, Gazole Town, Madnahar, Buniadpur, Gangarampur, Patiram, Balurghat and Chapahat and terminates at Hili.
The total length of SH 10 is 173 km.

Road sections
It is divided into different sections as follows:

See also
List of state highways in West Bengal

References

State Highways in West Bengal
Transport in Maldah